Juannularia is a genus of land snails with an operculum, terrestrial gastropod mollusks in the family Pomatiidae.

Species 
Species within the genus Juannularia include:
 Juannularia arguta (Pfeiffer, 1858)
 Juannularia perplicata (Gundlach, 1857)

References 

Pomatiidae